Pattaya Football Club is a new Thai football club based in Pattaya, Chonburi. Established in 1987. Playing in Thai League T4. The Club-licensing football club didn't pass to play 2018 Thai League 4 Eastern Region. This team is banned 2 years and Relegated to 2020 Thailand Amateur League Eastern Region.

Stadium and locations

Record

References

External links
 

Association football clubs established in 1987
Football clubs in Thailand
1987 establishments in Thailand